Metso Oyj was a Finnish industrial machinery company focusing on providing technology and services for mining, aggregates, and oil and gas, recycling, pulp and paper and other process industries.

On 30 June 2020, Metso's partial demerger and combination of Metso Minerals business unit and Outotec took place. Two new companies started operations 1 July 2020: Neles and Metso Outotec.

History 
In 2013, Metso demerged into two separate companies: Metso Corporation and Valmet Corporation.

1990s
Metso was created on 1 July 1999 through the merger of Valmet, a paper and board machine supplier, and Rauma, which focused on fiber technology, rock crushing and flow control solutions.

In 1998 Rauma's businesses included:

 Timberjack forest machines
 Sunds Defibrator fiber technology equipment
 Nordberg rock crushers
 Neles Controls valve-control systems

The new company had overlapping operations and to some extent the same customer base too. The purpose of the merger was the will to grow particularly in process technology. For a bigger company it seemed to be easier to survive better in international markets. The company's scope of business became more diversified than before and there were critics of the merger saying that easier growth would have been achieved if the two companies would have each acquired a competitor in their own core business sector.

The new company had offices in 50 countries and 32,000 employees after a personnel reduction of 2,000 people, and it operated in four sectors:

 Paper machines
 Forest machines (divested in 2001)
 Fiber technology
 Rock crushing plants

The name for the new company was sought in an employee contest. There were 3 suggestions for the name Metso among the total 6 500 suggestions. All the three who had suggested the name Metso received a monetary prize. Metso is the Finnish word for Wood Grouse, also known as The Western Capercaillie (Tetrao urogallus), Heather Cock or Capercaillie. Wood Grouse is found across Europe lives e.g. in Finnish pine forests. Metso's logo mimics the shape of the wings of a Wood Grouse.

2000s
Sundberg and Hakala did not stay that long in Metso's management. Tor Bergman became the new President and CEO in 2001. In 2001, Metso's net sales were EUR 4.7 billion, and it had 28,500 employees.

The new Metso Group was divided into three business areas:

 Fiber and Paper Technology
 Automation and Control Technology
 Machinery

The merger of Valmet and Rauma had given direction to the company's future focus on

 Pulp, paper and energy production technologies
 Equipment needed for the construction, mining and recycling industries
 Automation and control systems for the process industry

This formed Metso's three main business areas:

 Metso Paper
 Metso Minerals 
 Metso Automation

Business operations outside the core businesses were divested. For example, in 2000, Metso acquired the roll cover business and paper machine servicing operations, including paper machine technologies, from the American paper machine manufacturer Beloit (corporation), and the American John Deere aka Deere & Company acquired the forest machine manufacturer Timberjack from Metso. In 2001, Metso acquired the Swedish Svedala Industri AB, a manufacturer of rock and minerals processing equipment.

In 2002, Metso announced that it would not achieve its profit targets for two years, and a loss in excess of EUR 300 million was recorded for July–September. The reason for difficulties was Svedala. In 2003, a loss of over EUR 200 million was recorded and in September 2003, President and CEO Bergman was forced to resign because of the company's poor results. Jorma Eloranta was selected as Bergman's successor. He started in March 2004.

Between 2004 and 2007, Metso's net sales increased from EUR 3.6 billion to EUR 6.3 billion, and the profit margin rose from 5.5 percent to 9.3 percent.
During Eloranta's tenure, Metso increased its net sales and improved its financial performance for 19 consecutive quarters (2004–2008).

Metso's business functions had divided into three sectors (Metso Paper, Metso Minerals and Metso Automation) with over 28,000 employees and net sales of EUR 6.4 billion. In fact, at that point, it was Metso's best year ever in terms of operating profit and net sales, but the rapidly weakened market situation in the second half of the year forced Metso to initiate sizable measures to adjust its operations.

By 2008, Metso had become Finland's ninth largest company and the number of Metso shareholders had increased from 25,000 to 42,000. Metso strengthened its market position and service capacity in growing markets, particularly in India and China. During 2008, the expansions to the Ahmedabad foundry and the Bawal factory in India were completed.

Metso also purchased the paper machine technology of Japanese Mitsubishi Heavy Industries’ (MHI), making Metso the sole owner of Beloit's paper machinery intellectual property globally.

In September 2008, Metso sold 83% of its foundry in Sweden to an investment group assembled by the Primaca investment company. The Metso Foundries Karlstad unit specialized in casts of wind power components, diesel engine blocks and Yankee cylinders for paper machines.

By 2009, half of Metso's orders received in 2009 came from emerging markets, compared to less than one fifth in 1999.  In the same year, Metso entered into a combination agreement with Tamfelt, one of the world's leading suppliers of technical textile. Subsequently, Metso made a public exchange offer for all of Tamfelt's shares.

In the first half of 2009, Metso laid off over 700 employees and shut down several small units in e.g. Tampere, Turku, Oulu and Hollola. The operations of the shut-down units were integrated with the Järvenpää and Jyväskylä units. Metso's strategy for the 2000s was to manufacture wide, high-speed paper machines and discontinue its traditional paper machine concepts.

2010s
Matti Kähkönen was appointed the new President and CEO of Metso Corporation on 1 March 2011. Previously, Kähkönen had headed Metso's Mining and Construction segment. Despite the global economic uncertainty, Metso's profitability grew steadily in 2011. The services business, with a value of over three billion euros, accounted for about 40 percent of orders received in 2011.

In September 2012, Metso announced the need for a personnel reduction of more than 600 Finnish employees in several of its business units serving the paper industry and paper production. The reason for the reductions is structural change in the industry and due to that the weakening of paper business unit's competitiveness and profitability: competition has increased, demand for paper machine and foundry products has weakened. Customers want cheaper solutions than before. Metso had planned to give extra dividend for its shareholders but after the decision of paying dividends while cutting staff was criticized e.g. by personnel and the Finnish politics the decision was cancelled.

In 2012, Metso agreed to form a joint venture with China's LiuGong Group to develop the track-mounted crushing business in China, consolidated its valve operations in the United States into new premises in Massachusetts and opened a new valve supply and service center in Vadodara, India. In the same year, Metso acquired the Korean valve manufacturer Valstone Control Inc., U.S. software company ExperTune Inc. and 75 percent of the Chinese crushing and screening equipment producer Shaorui Heavy Industries.

Metso Recycling business offers metal and waste recycling equipment and services globally. On 1 September 2011, Metso announced that the Recycling business would be managed as a separate entity while Metso reviews other strategic alternatives for it. As part of this process, Metso evaluated both external and internal options. On 25 October 2012, Metso announced that Metso Recycling will be integrated into Mining and Construction as of 1 December 2012.

In August 2013, Metso closed the acquisition of Chinese manganese steel foundry JX.

2013 company demerge
On 1 October 2013, the Extraordinary General Meeting approved the demerger of Metso into two companies. At the start of 2014, Metso Corporation's Mining and Construction business and Automation business formed the new Metso Corporation and Metso's Pulp, Paper and Power business formed a new independent company under the name Valmet Corporation.

In December 2013 Metso reduced its holding in Valmet Automotive to approximately 41%. As a result of this arrangement, Valmet Automotive ceased to be a Metso subsidiary.

In 2015, Metso divested its Process Automation Systems (PAS) business to Valmet, focusing on their mining and aggregates industries operations and on the flow control systems manufacturing business.

2020 partial demerger and combination of Metso Minerals and Outotec 
In July 2019, it was announced that Metso and Outotec are planning to combine Metso’s Minerals business unit with Outotec. Their combination is complementary and the new company, Metso Outotec will leverage their strengths. The new company’s headquarters will be in Finland and it will maintain its listing on Nasdaq Helsinki. Before the transaction can be completed, the approval is needed by a majority of two-thirds of votes cast and shares represented at the respective EGMs of Metso and Outotec, as well as regulatory approvals.

All regulatory approvals were received by 18 June 2020 and partial demerger was registered on 30 June 2020.  Metso Outotec and Neles started operations on 1 July 2020.

Organization

Corporate governance
Metso's President and CEO as well as Chairman of the Executive Team is Pekka Vauramo as of 1 November 2018.

Metso’s Board of Directors

Metso's Board includes the following members.
Mikael Lilius (Chairman since 31 December 2013. Board member since 2013.)
Christer Gardell (Vice Chairman since 31 December 2013. Board member since 2006.)
Peter Carlsson (2016–)
Lars Josefsson (2013–)
Nina Kopola (2013–)
Antti Mäkinen (2018–)
Kari Stadigh
Arja Talma (2016–)
Raimo Brand

Metso Executive Team
The Executive Team includes the following members.
Pekka Vauramo, President and CEO
Eeva Sipilä, CFO and Deputy to CEO
Stephan W Kirsch, President, Mining Equipment business area
Markku Simula, President, Aggregates Equipment business area
Olli Isotalo, President, Valves 
Sami Takaluoma, President, Minerals Consumables business area
Uffe Hansen, President, Recycling business area
Giuseppe Campanelli, President, Minerals Services business area
Kalle Sipilä, President, Pumps business area
Jani Puroranta, Chief Digital Officer

Minerals processing

Products and services
For minerals processing in the mining, aggregates and recycling industries, Metso's offering includes crushers, screens, mining solutions, grinding mills and media, conveyors, solutions for bulk materials handling as well as process, pyro processing and recycling equipment.

Competitors
Metso's biggest competitors in the mining industry include FLSmidth, Outotec and ThyssenKrupp, and in the construction industry Terex, Atlas Copco, Caterpillar and Sandvik.

Flow control 

Metso's flow control business develops and produces valves and services for various process industries. The business sector was formed in 1999 through the merger of the process automation systems manufacturer Valmet Automation and Neles Controls, a manufacturer of valves and flow control systems.

Customers
Metso's customers operate in mining, aggregates, recycling and process industries.

Share
Metso's share was listed on the Helsinki Stock Exchange. The share was previously traded also on the New York Stock Exchange, but the listing there ended on 14 September 2007 and now, in the US, it is exchanged on the over-the-counter (OTC) market.

Starting from 1 July, Metso's share is continued by Neles.

Shareholders
Metso's biggest registered shareholders on 30 September 2016 were:

Solidium Oy (14.9%) 
Keskinäinen työeläkevakuutusyhtiö Varma(3.4%)
Keskinäinen Eläkevakuutusyhtiö Ilmarinen (1.5%)
Odin -rahastot (1.0%)
Valtion Eläkerahasto (1.0%)
Keva (1.0%)
Mandatum Henkivakuutusosakeyhtiö (1.0%)
Svenska litteratursällskapet i Finland r.f. (0.8%) 
Keskinäinen Työeläkevakuutusyhtiö Elo (0.6%)
Schweizerische Nationalbank (0.5%)

References

External links 

Engineering companies of Finland
Manufacturing companies of Finland
Manufacturing companies based in Helsinki
Manufacturing companies established in 1999
Manufacturing companies disestablished in 2020
2020 mergers and acquisitions
Finnish brands
Pulp and paper companies of Finland
1999 establishments in Finland
2020 disestablishments in Finland